Danillo Sena is an American politician who is the member of the Massachusetts House of Representatives from the 37th Middlesex district. He was elected in a special election on June 2, 2020, against Republican Cathy Clark. The election was held to replace former Representative Jen Benson, who resigned back in January 2020 to become the new President of the Alliance for Business Leadership.

He is a member of the Massachusetts Black and Latino Legislative Caucus.

See also
 2019–2020 Massachusetts legislature
 2021–2022 Massachusetts legislature

References

Living people
21st-century American politicians
American people of Brazilian descent
American politicians of Brazilian descent
Hispanic and Latino American state legislators in Massachusetts
Democratic Party members of the Massachusetts House of Representatives
University of Massachusetts Amherst alumni
People from Pernambuco
Brazilian emigrants to the United States
1986 births